Ulvenatten (Night of the Wolf) is a Norwegian action and drama film from 2008 directed by Kjell Sundvall. It is based on Tom Egeland's 2005 novel of the same name. The film premiered in Norway on February 29, 2008. The film was seen by 61,672 viewers at Norwegian cinemas.

Plot
The film is portrays a live debate program on television, when terrorists from Chechnya take host Kristin Bye and the debaters hostage.

Cast

Anneke von der Lippe as Kristin Bye, the program host
Dejan Čukić as Ramzan, a terrorist
Christian Skolmen as Thomas Fjell, the hostage negotiator
Ingar Helge Gimle as Aksel Schjeldrup, the operational manager
Jørgen Langhelle as Bjørn Lehman, a police anti-terror unit leader
Stig Henrik Hoff as Vidar Bø, a Delta police member
Sigrid Huun as Silje Gran
Ramadan Huseini as Ulven (the Wolf), a terrorist
Lars Arentz-Hansen as Leder, a Delta quartermaster 
Ramil Aliyev as a Chechen student

References

External links 
 
 Ulvenatten at the National Library of Norway
 Ulvenatten at the Swedish Film Database

2008 films
Norwegian action drama films
Norwegian action thriller films
Films based on books
Films directed by Kjell Sundvall
2000s Norwegian-language films